Solid Pleasure is the debut album from Swiss electronic trio Yello. It was first released in 1980 and was reissued in 2005 in part of Yello Remaster Series with rare bonus tracks.

Track listing

Personnel
Yello
Dieter Meier – vocals
Boris Blank – keyboards, sampling, vocals on "Eternal Legs"
Carlos Perón – tape effects

with:
Chico Hablas – guitar
Felix Haug – drums
Walt Keiser – drums

Charts
Solid Pleasure was released in 1980, spent a solitary week on the Australian (ARIA charts) at number 146 this week in July 1991, with their album Baby debuting the same week.

References 

Yello albums
1980 debut albums
Ralph Records albums
Mercury Records albums
Vertigo Records albums